Jerónimo Ruiz Camargo (died 3 January 1633) was a Roman Catholic prelate who served as Bishop of Córdoba (1632–1633), Bishop of Coria (1622–1632), and Bishop of Ciudad Rodrigo (1613–1622).

Biography
On 12 August 1613, Jerónimo Ruiz Camargo was appointed during the papacy of Pope Paul V as Bishop of Ciudad Rodrigo.
In 1614, he was consecrated bishop by Juan Beltrán Guevara y Figueroa, Bishop of Badajoz. 
On 23 May 1622, he was appointed during the papacy of Pope Gregory XV as Bishop of Coria.
On 16 February 1632, he was appointed during the papacy of Pope Urban VIII as Bishop of Córdoba.
He served as Bishop of Córdoba until his death on 3 January 1633.

References

External links and additional sources
 (for Chronology of Bishops) 
 (for Chronology of Bishops) 
 (for Chronology of Bishops) 
 (for Chronology of Bishops) 
 (for Chronology of Bishops) 
 (for Chronology of Bishops) 

17th-century Roman Catholic bishops in Spain
Bishops appointed by Pope Paul V
Bishops appointed by Pope Gregory XV
Bishops appointed by Pope Urban VIII
1633 deaths